The 2005 Moscow Victory Day Parade was a military parade which took place in Red Square in Moscow on 9 May 2005 to celebrate the 60th anniversary of the capitulation of Nazi Germany in 1945. The parade was inspected by the Minister of Defence Sergei Ivanov and it was commanded by Moscow Military District Commander General of the Army Ivan Efremov. Music was performed by the Massed Bands of the Moscow Garrison directed by Colonel Valery Khalilov on his 3rd national parade, the first to include 4 international marching bands. After the inspection of the troops, President of the Russian Federation Vladimir Putin gave his 6th-holiday address to the nation. More than 150 foreign dignitaries (included 50 heads of state) were presented. Among them were Secretary General of the United Nations Kofi Annan, European Commission President Jose Manuel Barroso, UNESCO Director General Koichiro Matsuura, President of the United States George W. Bush, Japanese Prime Minister Junichirō Koizumi, French President Jacques Chirac, Chancellor of Germany Gerhard Schroeder, President of Kazakhstan Nursultan Nazarbayev and President of Turkmenistan Saparmurat Niyazov. It was the largest parade in the history of Russia, and one of the largest in the world's history.

Parade
This was the last time veterans took part directly as participants. This time through, reenacting the motorized infantry of the original 1945 parade mobile column, many veterans of the fronts rode in the very trucks which carried infantry to the front lines of the war, arranged accordingly by the fronts they took part at war's end. Veterans from nations such as North Korea and Turkmenistan took part in the parade alongside their Russian counterparts.

Troops participating in the parade
Following the parade commander's car the parade marched past the saluting grandstand in the following order,

 Corps of Drums of the Moscow Military Music School
 Color Guard of the Victory Banner, the Flag of Russia, and the Armed Forces Colour from the 1st Honor Guard Battalion of the 154th Independent Commandant's Regiment
 Historical Unit
 Infantry of the Red Army
 Tank forces
 Artillery 
 Engineering formations
 Reconnaissance and commando formations
 K-9 units of NKVD
 Soviet Air Force
 Soviet Navy
 1st Cavalry Squadron, Presidential Cavalry Escort Battalion, Kremlin Regiment
 Red Army Veterans in military trucks, arranged in the fronts in order of the 1945 Victory Parade
 Karelian
 Leningrad
 1st Baltic
 3rd Belorussian
 2nd Belorussian
 1st Belorussian
 1st Ukrainian
 2nd Ukrainian
 3rd Ukrainian
 4th Ukrainian
 Combined Arms Academy of the Armed Forces of the Russian Federation
 Peter the Great Military Academy of the Strategic Missile Forces
 Military University of the Ministry of Defense of the Russian Federation
 Military Engineering Academy
 Military University of Radiation, Chemical and Biological Defense named after Marshal Timoshenko
 Gagarin Air Force Academy
 Military Aviation Technical University named after NE Zhukovsky
 Baltic Naval Institute
 Civil Defence Academy of the Ministry of Emergency Situation
 Moscow Military Institute of the Federal Border Service of the Russian Federation
 Ryazan Higher Airborne Command School
 331st Guards Parachute Regiment, 98th Guards Airborne Division
 Internal Troops of the Ministry of Internal Affairs of Russia
 336th Guards Naval Infantry Brigade of the Baltic Fleet
 Suvorov Military School
 Nakhimov Naval School
 Moscow Higher Military Command School

Music
The music and marches were played by the Military Band of the Armed Forces of Russia under the direction of Colonel Valery Khalilov

 Inspection and address
 March of the Preobrazhensky Regiment (Марш Преображенского Полка)
 Slow March of the Tankmen (Встречный Марш Танкистов) by Semyon Tchernetsky
 Slow March to Carry the War Flag (Встречный Марш для выноса Боевого Знамени) by Dmitriy Valentinovich Kadeyev
 Slow March of the Guards of the Navy (Гвардейский Встречный Марш Военно-Морского Флота) by Nikolai Pavlocich Ivanov-Radkevich
 Slow March of the Officers Schools (Встречный Марш офицерских училищ) by Semyon Tchernetsky
 Slow March (Встречный Марш) by Dmitry Pertsev
 Slow March of the Red Army (Встречный Марш Красной Армии) by Semyon Tchernetsky
 March of the Preobrazhensky Regiment (Марш Преображенского Полка)
 Glory (Славься) by Mikhail Glinka
 Parade Fanfare All Listen! (Парадная Фанфара «Слушайте все!») by Andrei Golovin
 National Anthem of the Russian Federation (Государственный Гимн Российской Федерации) by Alexander Alexandrov
 Signal Retreat (Сигнал «Отбой»)

 Veteran and mobile column

 March General Miloradovich (Марш Генерал Милорадович) by Valery Khalilov
 Farewell of Slavianka (Прощание Славянки) by Vasiliy Agapkin
 Defenders of Moscow (Защитников Москвы) by Boris Alexandrovich Mokroysov
 Artillery March (Марш Артиллеристов) by Tikhon Khrennikov
 Katyusha (Катюша) by Matvey Blanter
 Ballad of a Soldier (Баллада о Солдате) by Vasily Pavlovich Solovyov-Sedoy
 Sacred War (Священная Война) by Alexandr Alexandrov
 March The track to the frontline/The Song of the frontline driver (Марш «Дорожка фронтовая»/Песенка фронтового шофёра) by Boris Andreyevich Mokrousov
 March Victory (Марш Победа) by Albert Mikhailovich Arutyunov
 Lefort's March (Лефортовский Марш) by Valery Khalilov
 On Guard for the Peace (На страже Мира) by Boris Alexandrovich Diev
 Combat March (Строевой Марш) by Dmitry Illarionovich Pertsev
 Air March (Авиамарш) by Yuliy Abramovich Khait
 March of the Cosmonauts/Friends, I believe (Марш Космонавтов /Я верю, друзья) by Oskar Borisovich Feltsman
 March Farewell, rocky mountains (Марш/Песня «Прощайте, скалистые горы») by Evgeny Emmanuilovich Zharkovsky
 Crew is One Family (Экипаж - одна семья) by Viktor Vasilyevich Pleshak
 We are the Army of the People (Мы Армия Народа) by Georgy Viktorovich Mavsesya
 We Need One Victory (Нам Нужна Одна Победа) by Bulat Shalvovich Okudzhava
 Glory to the Heroes (Слава героям) by Dmitry Illarionovich Pertsev
 On the Road (В Путь) by Vasily Pavlovich Solovyov-Sedoy
 In Defense of the Homeland (В защиту Родины) by Viktor Sergeyevich Runov

 Conclusion
 Victory Day (День Победы) by David Fyodorovich Tukhmanov
 Song of the Russian Army (Песня о Российской Армии) by Alexandr Alexandrov

Dignitaries in attendance 
The Victory Day parade drew many international statesman to the Russian capital in the days leading up to 9 May. According to the Russian government, top leaders from 56 countries were invited to join Putin in the 2005 parade. In total, about 150 countries were represented at the parade. It was the largest gathering of world leaders in Russian history. The parade was the first one to be attended by world leaders since the 1995 parade (which attracts 57 countries).

Chancellor Gerhard Schroeder brought with him a group of Wehrmacht veterans, whom Vladimir Putin personally approached after a military parade on Red Square. Prime Minister Silvio Berlusconi also arrived with Italian veterans.

Cancelled attendees
President of Georgia Mikheil Saakashvili, as well as two Presidents of Baltic nations, did not attend despite being invited. Saakashvili justified his refusal to attend by saying that "there was nothing much to celebrate in Moscow", instead hosting a ceremony at the Tomb of the Unknown Soldier in Tbilisi, and hosting President Bush in the Georgian capital the following day. Lithuanian President Valdas Adamkus and Estonian President Arnold Rüütel jointly announced their non-participation in the parade on 7 March. They were all represented by lower-level politicians. In addition to that, a number of ambassadors and war veterans were presented as private attendees. British Prime Minister Tony Blair was unable to attend due to an emergency engagement followed the 2005 United Kingdom general election. Belarusian President Alexander Lukashenko was also invited, however instead chose to preside over the Victory Day Parade on Minsk's Victors Avenue.

Gallery

See also 
 Moscow Victory Parade of 1945
 Victory Day (9 May)
 Victory in Europe Day
 Victory Day Parades

References

External links
HD Russian Army Parade, Victory Day 2005 Парад Победы

Moscow Victory Day Parades
2005 in Russia
2005 in military history
May 2005 events in Russia
2005 in Moscow